The discography for Japanese pop/rock duo Puffy AmiYumi consists of 12 studio albums, 4 compilation albums, 2 remix albums, 12 video albums and 32 singles.
Their first single Asia no Junshin became an instant hit in Japan where it sold more than a million records and help to catapult the group. 
Jet-CD is their most successful album (having sold more than a million copies only in Japan), Kore ga watashi no ikiru michi is their most successful single (having sold more than 1.5 million copies only in Japan). They have sold more than 15 million records worldwide.

Albums

Studio albums

Compilation albums

Singles

"Asia no Junshin" (1996) #3
"Kore ga Watashi no Ikiru Michi"  (1996) #1
"Circuit no Musume" (1997) #1
"Nagisa ni Matsuwaru etc."  (1997) #1
"Mother/Nehorina Hahorina" (1997) #5
"Ai no shirushi" (1998) #3
"Tararan/Puffy no Tourmen"  (1998) #4
"Puffy de Rumba" (1998) #14
"Nichiyobi no Musume" (1999) #15
"Yume no tame ni" (1999) #12
"Umi e to/Pool Nite" (2000) #15
"Boogie Woogie No. 5" (2000) #22
"Atarashii Hibi" (2001) #28
"Aoi Namida" (2001) #32
"Hurricane" (2002) #36
"Akai Buranko/Planet Tokyo" (2002) #45
"Sunrise" (2004) #24
"Hajimari no Uta/Nice Buddy" (2005) #33
"Hi Hi" (2005) #107
"Mogura Like" (2006) #35
"Tokyo I'm on My Way" (2006) #58
"Hazumu Rizumu" (2006) #15
"Hataraku Otoko" (2006) #41
"Boom Boom Beat/O Edo Nagareboshi IV " (2007) #47
"Oriental Diamond/Kuchibiru Motion " (2007) #55
"All Because Of You " (2008) #34
"My Story " (2008) #44
"Hiyori Hime " (2009) #38
"Dareka ga " (2009) #30
"R.G.W " (2010) #44
"Happy Birthday " (2011) #56
"Sweet Drops" (2011) #34
"Tomodachi no Wao!" (2012) #85
"Datsu Dystopia" (2013) #102
"Himitsu no Gimme Cat -Ufufu Honto yo-" (2014)
"Colorful Wave Surfers" (2015) 
"Puffypipoyama" (2015) #62
"Bouken no Dadada" (2017) 
"Susume Nonsense" (2018) 
"Hō yare ho" (2020) 
"Pathfinder" (2021)

DVDs
The release date on DVD is in parentheses

RUN! PUFFY! RUN! 1996 (2000)
TOUR! PUFFY! TOUR! 1997 (2000)
Jet Tour '98 (2000)
Jet 1998 (2000) - Music videos, including Chinese version of "Kore ga Watashi no Ikiru Michi"
Fever*Fever 1999 (2000) - Concert footage from Fever Fever tour
CLIPS  (2000.07.05 and VHS) #15 
PUFFY SPIKE Daisakusen (2001) - Concert footage
Rolling Debut Revue - Canada USA Tour 2002 (2002)
Funclips Funclub (2005) #99 
TOUR! PUFFY! TOUR! 10 Final (2006) # 168 
Sparks Go Go 15th Special Junk! Junk! Junk! (2006)  #186 
Sparks Go Go 20th Anniversary Special (Junk! Junk! Junk! 2010) #58

Other works
Hosted the Pa-Pa-Pa-Pa-Puffy show.
Appeared on Jimmy Kimmel Live! (April 25, 2005).
Played "Electric Beach Fever" and "That's the Way It Is" at Japan's New Year's Eve Countdown show (2005–2006).
Recorded a version of Girls Just Wanna Have Fun with Cyndi Lauper on her album, The Body Acoustic.
Recorded the Teen Titans theme song.
Recorded the opening theme (Sunrise) for SD Gundam Force.
Two songs from PUFFY's Solo Solo album, Yumi Yoshimura's solo song, Kyouki na Futari [Perfect Couple] for an opening theme and Ami Onuki's solo song, Tadaima [I'm Home] for an ending theme were recorded for Hare Tokidoki Buta (Tokyo Pig).
Recorded the song  Hito Natsu No Keiken on the Yamaguchi Momoe Tribute Album "Tribute Thank You For...".
Recorded a cover version of the Guitar Wolf song Can-Nana Fever on a tribute album "I Love Guitar Wolf Very Much".
Contributed backing vocals on Sayonara for an early American version and eventual Japanese version of Bleu's album Redhead.
Friends Forever was featured on the Scooby-Doo 2: Monsters Unleashed soundtrack.
Urei was featured in What's New Scooby-Doo? episode called Big Appetite in Little Tokyo (second season, first episode).
Hi Hi was featured in Chilean telenovela Brujas.
Asia no junshin was featured on the compilation album Japan For Sale Vol.1.
Asia no junshin was also featured in the arcade game Taiko no tatsujin 5.
Atarashii hibi was featured on the compilation album Japan For Sale Vol.2.
Hajimari no uta was featured on the compilations albums Jpop CD, Vol. 2 and Pikachu The Movie Song Best 1998-2008. It was also featured in Pokémon movie: Pokémon: Lucario and the Mystery of Mew.
Nice Buddy was featured in Gossip Girl episode called Seventeen Candles (first season, eighth episode).
Kore ga watashi no ikiru michi was featured in Heroes episode called Genesis (first season, first episode).
Kore ga watashi no ikiru michi was used in Donkey Konga 3.
Kore ga watashi no ikiru michi (The Readymade Darlin' Of Discothèque Track) was used in French/Japanese movie Wasabi.
Ai no shirushi was featured in Japanese movies Waterboys and Lovely Complex.
Recorded the opening theme (Hataraku Otoko, Unicorn cover) for anime Hataraki Man.
Recorded the opening theme (Oh Edo Nagareboshi IV) for anime Oh! Edo Rocket.
Recorded the opening theme (Hiyori Hime) for anime Genji Monogatari Sennenki.
Recorded the theme (Wedding Bell, Sugar cover) for Japanese drama Konkatsu!.
Recorded the theme (Dareka ga) for movie Naruto Shippūden 3: Inheritors of the Will of Fire.
Recorded the theme (Sweep Drops) for movie Usagi Drop (film).
Recorded the song (Now Romantic) for CD compilation Yoshimoto Cover & Best (CD).
Susume Nonsense was recorded as the eleventh ending theme for Chibi Maruko-chan (1995 series) appearing for the first time in episode 1119 premiered on October 8, 2017.
Performed Koi no Vacance song by The Peanuts for Chibi Maruko-chan (1995 series) Christmas Special premiered on December 23, 2018.
 Recorded a cover of The Night Begins to Shine for the ending of the Teen Titans Go! 4-part special based on the song, which was also included on the soundtrack CD

References

Discography
Discographies of Japanese artists
Rock music group discographies